John Langan (born July 6, 1969) is an American author and writer of contemporary horror.  Langan has been a finalist for International Horror Guild Award. In 2008, he was a Bram Stoker Award nominee for Best Collection, and in 2016, a Bram Stoker Award winner for his novel The Fisherman.  He is on the board of directors for the Shirley Jackson Awards.

Biography
John Langan received his Masters of Arts degree from State University of New York at New Paltz  and his Master of Philosophy from The Graduate Center, CUNY. He is an instructor at SUNY New Paltz, where he teaches creative writing and gothic fiction. He is also an adjunct professor at Marist College. Currently, he lives in upstate New York with his wife, two sons, and cat.

His fiction has appeared in The Magazine of Fantasy & Science Fiction and the anthologies Poe and The Living Dead. His first collection, Mr. Gaunt and Other Uneasy Encounters, was published by Prime Books; his first novel, House of Windows, was published by Night Shade Books.  In the novel acknowledgements he writes “This book had a hard time finding a home: the genre people weren’t happy with all the literary stuff; the literary people weren’t happy with all the genre stuff.”

Bibliography

Novels
 House of Windows (2009) 
 The Fisherman (2016)

Collections
 Mr. Gaunt and Other Uneasy Encounters (2008) 
 The Wide Carnivorous Sky and Other Monstrous Geographies (2013)
 Sefira and Other Betrayals (2019)
 Children of the Fang and Other Genealogies (2020)
 Corpsemouth And Other Autobiographies (2022)

Anthologies
 Creatures: Thirty Years of Monsters (2011) with Paul G. Tremblay

Included in anthologies
 “Altered Beast, Altered Me”, in Final Cuts: New Tales of Hollywood Horror and Other Spectacles (2020)
 “Natalia, Queen of the Hungry Dogs”, in Echos: The Saga Anthology of Ghost Stories (2019)
 “The Deep Sea Swell”, in The Devil and the Deep: Horror Stories of the Sea” (2018)
 “Lost in the Dark”, in Haunted Nights (2017)
 "Ymir", in  Children of Old Leech: A Tribute to the Carnivorous Cosmos of Laird Barron (2014) 
"Sweetums", in A Season In Carcosa  (2012) 
"In Paris, in the Mouth of Kronos", in The Best Horror of the Year: Volume Four (2012) 
 "City of the Dog", in The Best Horror of the Year: Volume Three (2011) 
"Technicolor", in The Best Horror of the Year: Volume Two (2010) 
"The Shallows", in Cthulhu's Reign (2010) and The Book of Cthulhu (2011) 
"Mr. Gaunt", in New Cthulhu: The Recent Weird (2011) 
 "Episode Seven: Last Stand Against the Pack in the Kingdom of the Purple Flowers", in Wastelands: Stories of the Apocalypse (2008)
"Anchor", in Autumn Cthulhu (2016)

Short fiction
 "On Skua Island" (2001) 
 "Mr. Gaunt" (2002) 
 "Tutorial" (2003) 
 "Episode Seven: Last Stand Against the Pack in the Kingdom of Purple Flowers" (2007)
 "Kids" (2008) 
 "How the Day Runs Down" (2008) 
 "Laocöon, or, The Singularity" (2008) 
 "Technicolor" (2009) 
 "The Wide, Carnivorous Sky" (2009) 
 
 "The Shallows" (2010) 
 "The Revel" (2010) 
 "In Paris, in the Mouth of Kronos" (2011) 
 "The Unbearable Proximity of Mr. Dunn's Balloons" (2011) 
 "The Third Always Beside You" (2011) 
 "Renfrew's Course" (2012) 
 "Bloom" (2012) 
 "Sweetums" (2012) 
 "Hyphae" (2012) 
 "With Max Barry in the Nearer Precincts" (2013) 
 "Mother of Stone" (2013) 
 "June, 1987. Hitchhiking, Mr. Norris" (2013) 
 "Children of the Fang" (2014) 
 "Episode Three: On the Great Plains, in the Snow" (2014)
 "To See, to Be Seen" (2016)

Essays
 "Letter" (Weird Tales, Winter 2001–02) (2001) 
 "Sailing the True Void: H. P. Lovecraft un Fritz Leiber's THE WANDERER" (2004) 
 "Strange Stories" (2007) 
 "Metaphysical Labyrinths and Fairy-Tale Archetypes" (2007) 
 "Domination of Black" (2007) 
 "Open Mouths, Ready to Feed" (2007) 
 "Boxing Lessons in a Bar: An Appreciation of Lucius Shepard" (2007) 
 ""Feed Me, Baby, Feed Me": Beyond the Pleasure Principle in Fritz Leiber's "Girl with the Hungry Eyes"" (2008)
 "Sympathy for Ig" (2010) 
 "The H Word: Choosing Gruesome Subjects" (2013) 
 "The Whirlpool: With Howard and Eudora on the Banks of the Perdido" (2014)

References

External links
 
 http://www.shirleyjacksonawards.org/jurors-advisory-board-board-of-directors/
 http://www.shocktotem.com/06/25/2014/a-conversation-with-john-langan/
 https://web.archive.org/web/20140912002302/https://www.marist.edu/registrar/catalog/pdfs/undergrad1415/adjunctfaculty.pdf
https://pstdarkness.com/2016/07/14/pstd-interview-john-langan/

1969 births
Living people
American horror writers
American male short story writers
American short story writers
City University of New York alumni
The Magazine of Fantasy & Science Fiction people
State University of New York at New Paltz alumni
Weird fiction writers
Writers from New York (state)